The Amax Sport 1700 is an Australian homebuilt aircraft that was designed and produced by Amax Engineering of Donvale, Victoria. When it was available the aircraft was supplied as a kit or in the form of plans for amateur construction.

Design and development
The Sport 1700 features a strut-braced parasol wing, a two-seats-in-tandem open cockpit with a windshield, fixed conventional landing gear and a single engine in tractor configuration.

The aircraft fuselage is made from welded 4130 steel tubing, while the wing is of wooden construction, with the whole aircraft covered in doped aircraft fabric.

The manufacturer estimates the construction time from the supplied kit as 500 hours.

Specifications (Sport 1700)

References

Sport 1700
1990s Australian sport aircraft
Single-engined tractor aircraft
Parasol-wing aircraft
Homebuilt aircraft